The Storm over the gentry was a major historiographical debate among scholars that took place in the 1940s and 1950s regarding the role of the gentry in causing the English Civil War of the 17th century. (The British gentry was the rich landowners who were not members of the aristocracy.)

Economic historian R.H. Tawney had suggested in 1941 that there was a major economic crisis for the nobility in the 16th and 17th centuries and that the rapidly-rising gentry class was demanding a share of power. When the aristocracy resisted, Tawney argued, the gentry launched the civil war.

Lawrence Stone, in a 1948 article, made an effort to use statistical data and methods to prove Tawney's thesis. However, Stone's argument was marred by methodological mistakes, and he came under heavy attack from Hugh Trevor-Roper and others. Trevor-Roper argued that the gentry was declining and so tried to improve its fortune through the law or the court office. Christopher Thompson, for example, showed that the peerage's real income was higher in 1602 than in 1534 and grew substantially by 1641. Many other scholars entered the fray and produced many valuable studies.

American scholar JH Hexter developed a widely accepted view that largely ended the debate by saying neither a rise nor a decline of the gentry could explain the Civil War; such theories could explain only a deliberate revolution, which did not take place.

See also
 Historiography of the United Kingdom
 Stuart period

References

Further reading

 Hexter, J.H.  On History (1979) pp. 149-236.
 Hexter, Jack H. Reappraisals in history: New views on history and society in early modern Europe (1961)
 Loades, David, ed. Reader's Guide to British History (2003) 2:1200-1206
 MacDonald, William W. "English Historians Repeating Themselves: The Refining of the Whig Interpretation of the English Revolution and Civil War." Journal of Thought (1972): 166-175. online
 Richardson, R.C. The Debate on the English Revolution (Issues in Historiography) (1998). pp 98-132.
 Stone, Lawrence. Social Change and Revolution in England, 1540–1640 (1965)
 Stone, Lawrence. The Crisis of the Aristocracy, 1558–1641 (1965), 841pp

 Trevor-Roper, R. H. "The Gentry 1540-1640." Economic History Review 1 (1953): 1-55. 
 Tawney, R. H. "The rise of the gentry, 1558-1640." Economic History Review 11.1 (1941): 1-38. online; launched a historiographical debate
 Tawney, R. H. "The rise of the gentry: a postscript." Economic History Review 7.1 (1954): 91-97. online

Historiography of England
Social class in the United Kingdom